A flageolet is a wind instrument similar to a recorder.

Flageolet may also refer to:
 Flageolet (organ stop), a pipe organ component
 The flageolet bean, a type of common bean
 A method of playing a string harmonic

See also
 Whistle register, the highest register of the human voice lying above the modal register and falsetto register